Acanthofrontia is a genus of erebid moths in the subfamily Arctiinae with Afrotropical distribution. It was described by George Hampson in 1910.

Species
As of November 2019, AfroMoths lists the following species:
 Acanthofrontia anacantha Hampson, 1914
 Acanthofrontia atricosta Hampson, 1918
 Acanthofrontia bianulata (Wichgraf, 1922)
 Acanthofrontia dicycla Hampson, 1918
 Acanthofrontia frontalis (Strand, 1909)
 Acanthofrontia lithosiana Hampson, 1910 - type species

References

Lithosiini
Moth genera